HGHS may refer to:

 , in Habiganj, Bangladesh 
 Hamilton Girls' High School, in New Zealand
 Hazel Green High School, in Alabama, United States
 Hazel Grove High School, in Stockport, Greater Manchester, United Kingdom
 Hialeah Gardens High School, in Hialeah Gardens, Florida, United States
 Horace Greeley High School, in Chappaqua, New York, United States
 Hornsby Girls' High School, in Sydney, New South Wales, Australia